LeBaron Incorporated (originally LeBaron, Carrossiers Inc.) was an American design business from 1920 and also a coachbuilder from 1924 until 1953.

LeBaron was one of the many prominent coachbuilders in the 1920s to provide bodies for luxury cars. Until World War II most of the great prestige automakers like Duesenberg or Packard would readily supply only a running chassis which wealthy buyers would have fitted with custom bodywork. Automakers like  Rolls-Royce and Hispano-Suiza only supplied a running chassis.

LeBaron Incorporated eventually became part of Chrysler Corporation.

LeBaron, Carrossiers Inc
LeBaron, Carrossiers Inc. free-lance design consultants was founded in New York City in 1920 by American designers Raymond H. Dietrich (1894-1980) and Thomas L. Hibbard (1898-1982) who had met while working for Brewster & Co. Dietrich and Hibbard remained among the  Brewster personnel so they invented a new name LeBaron, Carrossiers from a list of French words that could be easily pronounced but still sounded impressive.  Within twelve months Brewster learned what they were doing and ended their Brewster & Co business relationship. They found more work and Hibbard offered the LeBaron administrative jobs to his friend, Ralph Roberts, who had just gotten his Bachelor of Science degree from Dartmouth College. Most design work came to LeBaron through dealers.

Hibbard & Darrin
Hibbard met fellow designer, Howard A. "Dutch" Darrin (1897-1982) in 1923. Hibbard and Darrin decided to go to Paris, initially to try to sell LeBaron designs where manufacturing costs were lower but once in view of the opportunities decided to set up their own business in Paris and founded Hibbard & Darrin. Hibbard resigned from LeBaron in 1923.

LeBaron Inc.
Dietrich and Roberts continued operating LeBaron with a new illustrator, veteran Roland L. Stickney. LeBaron took over the Blue Ribbon and Bridgeport Body companies thus becoming body builders as well as designers and changed name to LeBaron Inc.

Dietrich Inc.
Dietrich received a lucrative offer from Murray Corporation, one of Ford's and Lincoln's main body builders, in 1925 and resigned from LeBaron to start Dietrich, Inc.  With both founders gone, LeBaron could have been in trouble.  But Roberts continued to run the company and orders kept coming in.
Walter O. Briggs began talks with Roberts in 1926 to buy LeBaron and move it to Detroit, setting up operations at Mack Avenue Stamping (Old Mack Factory).

Briggs Manufacturing

LeBaron was purchased by Briggs Manufacturing Company of Detroit in 1926 and operated as a subsidiary.  Briggs was already supplying bodies to nearby Chrysler, Essex, Ford, Hudson, and Overland.  As a Briggs subsidiary, LeBaron handled special custom work, provided design ideas for the main business, and supplied exquisite custom bodies for various car companies such as Chrysler's luxury Imperial line, Duesenberg, Packard, and Cadillac.  In 1932, for example, they built 28 Imperial Custom Convertible Coupes, Chrysler's top model, which rode a 146-inch wheelbase and used a 384.8 cubic-inch straight-8 engine.

Thomas L. Hibbard became design director at Ford in 1947. Raymond H. Dietrich was hired by Chrysler in 1932 to become the first official Chrysler stylist.

Briggs Manufacturing was purchased by Chrysler in December 1953.

Gallery

References

External links 

Coachbuilt: Briggs Manufacturing Co. - 1909-1954
Conceptcarz: Chrysler LeBaron news
Chrysler LeBaron History

Coachbuilders of the United States
Design companies established in 1920
Defunct companies based in Connecticut
Companies disestablished in 1953
Companies based in Bridgeport, Connecticut
1920 establishments in New York City
1953 disestablishments in Connecticut
Chrysler